The Dualex is an optical sensor developed by Force-A (No longer in business) for the assessment of flavonol, anthocyanin, and chlorophyll contents in leaves. The sensor is a result of technology transfer from the CNRS (National Center for Scientific Research) and University of Paris-Sud Orsay. It allows to perform real-time and non-destructive measurements. The main applications are plant science and agriculture research.

Calculated indices
The assessment of polyphenolic compounds in leaves is based on the absorbance of the leaf epidermis through the screening effect it procures to chlorophyll fluorescence. 
The indices calculated by Dualex are:
 Anth, for the anthocyanin index
 Chl, for the chlorophyll index
 Flav, for the flavonols index
 NBI, for the nitrogen balance index

Applications
Based on the four measured indices, this optical sensor is applied in the fields of research as follows:
 Plant physiology
 Genetic studies
 Plant phenology
 Herbal selection

It is equally applied in studies related to chlorophyll (nutritional chlorosis, potential photosynthesis), flavonols (UV protection, leaf light environment) and anthocyanins (temperature stress, light selection).

References

Optical devices
Sensors